Prince of Coolavin was a title first applied by popular usage to Charles MacDermot, 1707–1758, then head of the MacDermot family of Moylurg. Coolavin is a barony in south County Sligo in Ireland.  Up to the late 16th century the head of the family were still Kings of Moylurg, but had lost their lands due to confiscation. 

The adoption of the term indicated that the family considered themselves "princes", and also considered as such by their neighbours. The title continued to be used by the head of the family into the 21st century.

Title holders

 Charles MacDermot, 1707–1758, first to be styled Prince of Coolavin.
 Myles MacDermot, died 1758-1792.
 Hugh MacDermot, M.D., 1792-1824.
 Charles Joseph MacDermot, J.P., 1824-1873.
 Hugh Hyacinth O'Rorke MacDermot, 1873-1904.
 Charles Edward MacDermot, 1904-1947.
 Charles John MacDermot, 1947-1979.
 Dermot MacDermot, 1979-1989.
 Niall Anthony MacDermot, 1989-2003. 
 Rory MacDermot, 2004-2021.

In popular culture
The Princess Royal or Miss 'MacDermot was a tune by the Irish harpist Turlough O'Carolan (1670 – 25 March 1738).  The tune was adopted for the sea shanty The Saucy Arethusa which was performed at the Theatre Royal in London in 1796.  While some attribute The Saucy Aruthesa to the composer William Shield, others have attributed the adaptation to the playwright Prince Hoare.

A film, titled Heroes and Princes, was produced by the children of St. Aiden's National School, Monasteraden and celebrates the MacDermots of Collavin. It includes a composition titled The Prince's March.

See also
 Chiefs of the Name

References

 
MacDermot family